Isolepis inundata is a species of sedge native to Papua New Guinea, Australia and New Zealand. Common names include swamp club-rush. It was first described by prolific botanist Robert Brown in 1810.

References

inundata
Flora of New South Wales
Flora of New Zealand
Flora of Papua New Guinea
Flora of Queensland
Flora of South Australia
Flora of Tasmania
Flora of Victoria (Australia)
Angiosperms of Western Australia
Plants described in 1810